Rastovac is a small town in the municipality of Nikšić, Montenegro.

Demographics
According to the 2003 census, the town has a population of 1,513 people.

According to the 2011 census, its population was 1,535.

References

Populated places in Nikšić Municipality